The 2022 elections for the Indiana House of Representatives took place on Tuesday November 8, 2022, to elect representatives from all 100 Representative districts in the Indiana House of Representatives. The primary election took place on Tuesday May 3, 2022. The Republican Party has held a House majority since 2011.

The elections for Indiana United States Senator, Indiana's 9 congressional districts, and the Indiana Senate was also held on this date.

The Democratic Party needed to flip control of 22 seats to earn a majority in the Indiana House, however, they only flipped one seat.

Overview

Predictions

Incumbents defeated in primaries

Republicans
District 22: Curt Nisly lost renomination to fellow incumbent Craig Snow in a redistricting race.
District 45: Jeff Ellington lost renomination to fellow incumbent Bruce Borders in a redistricting race.
District 47: John Young lost renomination to Robb Greene.
District 50: Dan Leonard lost renomination to Lorissa Sweet.
District 93: John Jacob lost renomination to Julie McGuire.

District index

Districts 1–25

District 1
The district has been represented by Democrat Carolyn Jackson since 2018. Jackson was re-elected unopposed in 2020.

Democratic primary

Candidates

Declared
Carolyn Jackson, incumbent state representative

Results

General election

Results

District 2
The district has been represented by Democrat Earl Harris Jr. since 2016. Harris Jr. was re-elected unopposed in 2020.

Democratic primary

Candidates

Declared
Earl Harris Jr., incumbent state representative

Results

General election

Results

District 3
The district has been represented by Democrat Ragen Hatcher since 2018. Hatcher was re-elected unopposed in 2020.

Democratic primary

Candidates

Declared
Ragen Hatcher, incumbent state representative

Results

General election

Results

District 4
The district has been represented by Republican Edmond Soliday since 2006. Soliday was re-elected with 54.6% of the vote in 2020.

Republican primary

Candidates

Declared
Edmond Soliday, incumbent state representative

Results

General election

Results

District 5
The district has been represented by Republican Dale DeVon since 2012. DeVon was re-elected with 50.7% of the vote in 2020.

Republican primary

Candidates

Declared
Dale DeVon, incumbent state representative

Results

General election

Results

District 6
The district has been represented by Democrat Maureen Bauer since 2020. Bauer was first elected unopposed in 2020.

Democratic primary

Candidates

Declared
Maureen Bauer, incumbent state representative

Results

General election

Results

District 7
The district has been represented by Republican Jake Teshka since 2020. Teshka was first elected with 54.0% of the vote in 2020.

Republican primary

Candidates

Declared
 Jake Teshka, incumbent state representative
 Timothy Jaycox, nominee for Indiana's 8th Senate district in 2020
 Sarina Williams

Results

Democratic primary

Candidates

Declared
 Ross Deal, former state representative for this seat

Results

General election

Results

District 8
The district has been represented by Democrat Ryan Dvorak since 2002. Dvorak was re-elected with 56.8% of the vote in 2020.

Democratic primary

Candidates

Declared
Ryan Dvorak, incumbent state representative

Results

General election

Results

District 9
The district has been represented by Democrat Patricia Boy since 2018. Boy was elected with 56.6% of the vote in 2020.

Republican primary

Candidates

Declared
 Dion Bergeron, real estate broker, nominee for this district in 2020, and candidate for Indiana's 1st congressional district in 2020

Results

Democratic primary

Candidates

Declared
Patricia Boy, incumbent state representative

Results

General election

Results

District 10
The district has been represented by Democrat Charles Moseley since 2008. Moseley was re-elected unopposed in 2020.

Republican primary

Candidates

Declared
 Manuel Maldonaldo

Results

Democratic primary

Candidates

Declared
Charles Moseley, incumbent state representative

Results

General election

Results

District 11
The district has been represented by Republican Michael Aylesworth since 2014. Aylesworth was re-elected with 68.8% of the vote in 2020.

Republican primary

Candidates

Declared
 Michael Aylesworth, incumbent state representative
 Andrew Boersma
 Pierce Fischer

Results

General election

Results

District 12
The district has been represented by Democrat Mike Andrade since 2020. Andrade was first elected with 57.7% of the vote in 2020.

Democratic primary

Candidates

Declared
Mike Andrade, incumbent state representative

Results

General election

Results

District 13
The district has been represented by Republican Sharon Negele since 2012. Negele was re-elected with 72.8% of the vote in 2020.

Republican primary

Candidates

Declared
Sharon Negele, incumbent state representative

Results

General election

Results

District 14
The district has been represented by Democrat Vernon Smith since 1990. Smith was re-elected unopposed in 2020.

Democratic primary

Candidates

Declared
Vernon Smith, incumbent state representative

Results

General election

Results

District 15
The district has been represented by Republican Hal Slager since 2020, but previously held office from 2012 to 2018. Slager was elected with 51.5% of the vote in 2020.

Republican primary

Candidates

Declared
Hal Slager, incumbent state representative

Results

Democratic primary

Candidates

Declared
 Chris Kukuch, candidate for Indiana's 1st Senate district in 2018

Results

General election

Results

District 16
The district has been represented by Republican Douglas Gutwein since 2008. Gutwein was re-elected with 74.1% of the vote in 2020. Gutewin announced he will not be running for re-election and is retiring.

Republican primary

Candidates

Declared
 Kendell Culp, Jasper County commissioner
 Barbara Neihouser
 Bryan Washburn

Declined
 Douglas Gutwein, incumbent state representative

Results

General election

Results

District 17
The district has been represented by Republican Jack Jordan since 2016. Jordan was re-elected with 74.7% of the vote in 2020.

Republican primary

Candidates

Declared
Jack Jordan, incumbent state representative

Results

General election

Results

District 18
The district has been represented by Republican Craig Snow since 2020. Snow was first elected with 78.1% of the vote in 2020. Snow is now running in the 22nd district due to redistricting.

Republican primary

Candidates

Declared
David Abbott, incumbent state representative from district 82

Declined
Craig Snow, incumbent state representative (running in 22nd district)

Results

General election

Results

District 19
The district had been represented by Republican Julie Olthoff since 2020, but she previously represented it from 2014 to 2018. Olthoff was first elected with 51.8% of the vote in 2020.

Republican primary

Candidates

Declared
Julie Olthoff, incumbent state representative

Results

Democratic primary

Candidates

Declared
 Lisa Beck, former state representative for 19th district (2018—2020)

Results

General election

Results

District 20
The district has been represented by Republican Jim Pressel since 2016. Pressel was re-elected with 68.2% of the vote in 2020.

Republican primary

Candidates

Declared
 Jim Pressel, incumbent state representative
 Heather Oake

Results

General election

Results

District 21
The district has been represented by Republican Timothy Wesco since 2010. Wesco was re-elected with 64.5% of the vote in 2020.

Republican primary

Candidates

Declared
 Timothy Wesco, incumbent state representative
 Stephen Gray

Results

General election

Results

District 22
The district has been represented by Republican Curt Nisly since 2014. Nisly was re-elected with 72.1% of the vote in 2020. Due to redistricting, Craig Snow from the 18th district is now included as a representative for this district, triggering a primary.

Republican primary

Candidates

Declared
 Curt Nisly, incumbent state representative
 Craig Snow, incumbent state representative for the 18th district

Results

Democratic primary

Candidates

Declared
 Dee Moore, nominee for this district in 2016 and 2018

Results

Libertarian convention

Candidates

Declared
Josh Vergiels

General election

Results

District 23
The district has been represented by Republican Ethan Manning since 2018. Manning was re-elected unopposed in 2020.

Republican primary

Candidates

Declared
Ethan Manning, incumbent state representative

Results

General election

Results

District 24
The district has been represented by Republican Donna Schaibley since 2014. Schaibley was re-elected with 58.1% of the vote in 2020.

Republican primary

Candidates

Declared
Donna Schaibley, incumbent state representative

Results

Democratic primary

Candidates

Declared
 Joellyn Mayer

Results

General election

Results

District 25
The district has been represented by Republican Donald Lehe since 2002. Lehe was re-elected with 70.3% of the vote in 2020. Lehe announced he will not run for re-election and will be retiring.

Republican primary

Candidates

Declared
 Kent Abernathy, former commissioner of Indiana's Bureau of Motor Vehicles
 Becky Cash, small business owner
 Douglas Rapp
 Matthew Whetstone, lobbyist and former state representative

Declined
 Donald Lehe, incumbent state representative

Results

Democratic primary

Candidates

Declared
 Jen Bass-Patino

Disqualified/Withdrew
 Maurice Fuller, nominee for this district in 2014, 2016, and 2018, and candidate for this district in 2020

General election

Results

Districts 26–50

District 26
The district has been represented by Democrat Chris Campbell since 2018. Campbell was re-elected unopposed in 2020.

Democratic primary

Candidates

Declared
 Chris Campbell, incumbent state representative

Results

General election

Results

District 27
The district has been represented by Democrat Sheila Klinker since 1982. Klinker was re-elected with 62.1% of the vote in 2020.

Republican primary

Candidates

Declared
 James Hass, nominee for this district in 2010 and 2020
 Tim Radice, candidate for Indiana's 4th congressional district in 2018

Results

Democratic primary

Candidates

Declared
 Sheila Klinker, incumbent state representative

Results

General election

Results

District 28
The district has been represented by Republican Jeff Thompson since 1998. Thompson was re-elected with 71.5% of the vote in 2020.

Republican primary

Candidates

Declared
 Jeff Thompson, incumbent state representative

Results

Democratic primary

Candidates

Declared
 John Futrell, candidate for Indiana's 4th congressional district in 2014
 Eric Shotwell, nominee for this district in 2020

Results

General election

Results

District 29
The district has been represented by Republican Chuck Goodrich since 2018. Goodrich was re-elected with 66% of the vote in 2020.

Republican primary

Candidates

Declared
 Chuck Goodrich, incumbent state representative

Results

General election

Results

District 30
The district has been represented by Republican Michael Karickhoff since 2010. Karickhoff was re-elected with 66.1% of the vote in 2020.

Republican primary

Candidates

Declared
 Michael Karickhoff, incumbent state representative

Results

Democratic primary

Candidates

Declared
 Robin Williams

Results

General election

Results

District 31
The district has been represented by Republican Ann Vermilion since her appointment in 2019. Vermilion was re-elected unopposed in 2020.

Republican primary

Candidates

Declared
Ann Vermilion, incumbent state representative
Andy Lyons, retired teacher

Results

General election

Results

District 32
The district has been represented by Republican Tony Cook since 2014. Cook was re-elected with 75.4% of the vote in 2020.

Republican primary

Candidates

Declared
 Fred Glynn
 Suzie Jaworowski, former chief of staff of the Office of Nuclear Energy
 Paul Nix

Declined
 Tony Cook, incumbent state representative

Results

Democratic primary

Candidates

Declared
 Victoria Garcia Wilburn

Results

General election

Results

District 33
The district has been represented by Republican J. D. Prescott since 2018. Prescott was re-elected with 72.5% of the vote in 2020.

Republican primary

Candidates

Declared
 J. D. Prescott, incumbent state representative
 Brittany Kloer, candidate for this district in 2020

Results

Democratic primary

Candidates

Declared
 John E. Bartlett

Results

General election

Results

District 34
The district has been represented by Democrat Sue Errington since 2012. Errington was re-elected with 56.4% of the vote in 2020.

Republican primary

Candidates

Declared
 Dale Basham, retired teacher and nominee for this district in 2020
 Susan Dillion

Results

Democratic primary

Candidates

Declared
 Sue Errington, incumbent state representative

Results

General election

Results

District 35
The district has been represented by Republican Elizabeth Rowray since 2020. Rowray was first elected with 55.3% of the vote in 2020.

Republican primary

Candidates

Declared
 Elizabeth Rowray, incumbent state representative

Results

Democratic primary

Candidates

Declared
 Brad Sowinski

Results

General election

Results

District 36
The district has been represented by Democrat Terri Austin since 2002. Austin was re-elected with 53% of the vote in 2020.

Republican primary

Candidates

Declared
 Kyle Pierce, nominee for this district in 2020

Results

Democratic primary

Candidates

Declared
 Terri Austin, incumbent state representative

Results

General election

Results

District 37
The district has been represented by Republican Todd Huston since 2012. Huston was re-elected with 56.2% of the vote in 2020.

Republican primary

Candidates

Declared
 Todd Huston, incumbent state representative

Results

General election

Results

District 38
The district has been represented by Republican Heath VanNatter since 2010. VanNatter was re-elected with 71.5% of the vote in 2020.

Republican primary

Candidates

Declared
 Heath VanNatter, incumbent state representative

Results

General election

Results

District 39
The district has been represented by Republican Jerry Torr since 1996. Torr was re-elected with 53.6% of the vote in 2020.

Republican primary

Candidates

Declared
 Jerry Torr, incumbent state representative

Results

General election

Results

District 40
The district has been represented by Republican Greg Steuerwald since his appointment in 2007. Steuerwald was re-elected with 60% of the vote in 2020.

Republican primary

Candidates

Declared
 Greg Steuerwald, incumbent state representative

Results

General election

Results

District 41
The district has been represented by Republican Tim Brown since 1994. Brown was re-elected with 75.3% of the vote in 2020. Brown did not file to run for another term.

Republican primary

Candidates

Declared
 Richard Bagsby, pastor
 Mark Genda, funeral home owner
 Shane Weist, sales manager

Results

Democratic primary

Candidates

Declared
 Greg A. Woods, nominee for this district in 2020

Results

General election

Results

District 42
The district has been represented by Republican Alan Morrison since 2012. Morrison was re-elected with 66.8% of the vote in 2020.

Republican primary

Candidates

Declared
 Alan Morrison, incumbent state representative

Results

General election

Results

District 43
The district has been represented by Democrat Tonya Pfaff since 2018. Pfaff was re-elected with 57.5% of the vote in 2020.

Republican primary

Candidates

Declared
 Andrew McNeil

Results

Democratic primary

Candidates

Declared
 Tonya Pfaff, incumbent state representative

Results

General election

Results

District 44
The district has been represented by Republican Beau Baird since 2018. Baird was re-elected unopposed in 2020.

Republican primary

Candidates

Declared
 Beau Baird, incumbent state representative

Results

General election

Results

District 45
The district has been represented by Republican Bruce Borders since 2014, but previously held office from 2004 to 2012. Borders was re-elected unopposed in 2020. Jeff Ellington from the 62nd district was redistricted into this district, triggering a primary.

Republican primary

Candidates

Declared
 Bruce Borders, incumbent state representative
 Jeff Ellington, incumbent state representative for the 62nd district

Results

General election

Results

District 46
The district has been represented by Republican Bob Heaton since 2010. Heaton was re-elected unopposed in 2020.

Republican primary

Candidates

Declared
 Bob Heaton, incumbent state representative

Results

Democratic primary

Candidates

Declared
 Kurtis Cummings

Results

General election

Results

District 47
The district has been represented by Republican John Young since 2016. Young was re-elected unopposed in 2020.

Republican primary

Candidates

Declared
 Luke Campbell, U.S. Army veteran, evangelist, and candidate for the 57th district in 2018
 Robb Greene
 Scott Strother
 John Young, incumbent state representative

Results

General election

Results

District 48
The district has been represented by Republican Doug Miller since 2014. Miller was re-elected with 64.3% of the vote in 2020.

Republican primary

Candidates

Declared
 Doug Miller, incumbent state representative

Results

General election

Results

District 49
The district has been represented by Republican Joanna King since her appointment in 2020.

Republican primary

Candidates

Declared
 Joanna King, incumbent state representative

Results

General election

Results

District 50
The district has been represented by Republican Dan Leonard since 2002. Leonard was re-elected with 71.5% of the vote in 2020.

Republican primary

Candidates

Declared
 Dan Leonard, incumbent state representative
 Lorissa Sweet, Wabash County, Indiana councilwoman

Results

Democratic primary

Candidates

Declared
 Tammari Ingalls

Results

General election

Results

Districts 51–75

District 51
The district has been represented by Republican Dennis Zent since 2012. Zent was re-elected with 77.1% of the vote in 2020.

Republican primary

Candidates

Declared
 Dennis Zent, incumbent state representative

Results

Democratic primary

Candidates

Declared
 Jestin Coler
 Michael Travis

Results

General election

Results

District 52
The district has been represented by Republican Ben Smaltz since 2012. Smaltz was re-elected with 72% of the vote in 2020.

Republican primary

Candidates

Declared
 Ben Smaltz, incumbent state representative

Results

Libertarian convention

Candidates

Declared
Morgan Rigg

General election

Results

District 53
The district has been represented by Republican Bob Cherry since 1998. Cherry was re-elected unopposed in 2020.

Republican primary

Candidates

Declared
 Bob Cherry, incumbent state representative

Results

General election

Results

District 54
The district has been represented by Republican Tom Saunders since 1996. Saunders was re-elected unopposed in 2020. Saunders did not file to run for another term. Saunders announced he would be retiring in 2022 after serving the district for twenty-five years.

Republican primary

Candidates

Declared
 Cory Criswell, small business owner
 Nansi Custer
 Joshua Gillmore
 Melissa Meltzer
 Betsy Mills, Henry County Council member
 Bobbi Plummer, Henry County Commissioner
 Gayla Taylor, communications and marketing specialist

Declined
 Tom Saunders, incumbent state representative

Results

Democratic primary

Candidates

Declared
 Nan Polk

Results

General election

Results

District 55
The district has been represented by Republican Cindy Ziemke since 2012. Ziemke was re-elected unopposed in 2020. Ziemke did not file to run for another term. Ziemke announced she would be retiring in 2022.

Republican primary

Candidates

Declared
 John Moton
 Lindsay Patterson
 Curtis Ward
 Dave Welsh

Declined
 Cindy Ziemke, incumbent state representative

Results

General election

Results

District 56
The district has been represented by Republican Brad Barrett since 2018. Barrett was re-elected unopposed in 2020.

Republican primary

Candidates

Declared
 Brad Barrett, incumbent state representative
 Mark Pierce

Results

General election

Results

District 57
The district has been represented by Republican Sean Eberhart since 2006. Eberhart was re-elected unopposed in 2020. Eberhart did not file to run for another term.

Republican primary

Candidates

Declared
 Melinda Griesemer
 Craig Haggard

Results

General election

Results

District 58
The district has been represented by Republican Michelle Davis since 2020. Davis was first elected with 67.6% of the vote in 2020.

Republican primary

Candidates

Declared
 Michelle Davis, incumbent state representative

Results

General election

Results

District 59
The district has been represented by Republican Ryan Lauer since 2018. Lauer was re-elected with 59.9% of the vote in 2020.

Republican primary

Candidates

Declared
 Ryan Lauer, incumbent state representative
 William Nash

Results

Democratic primary

Candidates

Declared
 Ross Thomas, nominee for Indiana State Senate district 41 in 2018

Results

General election

Results

District 60
The district has been represented by Republican Peggy Mayfield since 2012. Mayfield was re-elected with 63.5% of the vote in 2020.

Republican primary

Candidates

Declared
 Brittany Caroll, attorney
 Peggy Mayfield, incumbent state representative

Results

General election

Results

District 61
The district has been represented by Democrat Matt Pierce since 2002. Pierce was re-elected unopposed in 2020.

Democratic primary

Candidates

Declared
 Matt Pierce, incumbent state representative

Results

General election

Results

District 62
The district has been represented by Republican Jeff Ellington since his appointment in 2015. Ellington was re-elected with 60.4% of the vote in 2020. Ellington was redistricted to the 45th district.

Republican primary

Candidates

Declared
 Dave Hall, Jackson County councilman
 Greg Knott, IT technician

Declined
 Jeff Ellington, incumbent state representative (running in 45th district)

Results

Democratic primary

Candidates

Declared
 Penny Githens, Monroe County commissioner
 Brad Swain, Monroe County sheriff

Results

General election

Results

District 63
The district has been represented by Republican Shane Lindauer since his appointment in 2017. Lindauer was re-elected with 73.8% of the vote in 2020.

Republican primary

Candidates

Declared
 Shane Lindauer, incumbent state representative

Results

Democratic primary

Candidates

Declared
 Teresa Kendall

Results

General election

Results

District 64
The district has been represented by Republican Matt Hostettler since 2018. Hostettler was re-elected with 75.9% of the vote in 2020.

Republican primary

Candidates

Declared
 Matt Hostettler, incumbent state representative

Results

General election

Results

District 65
The district has been represented by Republican Christopher May since 2016. May was re-elected with 72.9% of the vote in 2020.

Republican primary

Candidates

Declared
 John Lee
 Christopher May, incumbent state representative

Results

Democratic primary

Candidates

Declared
 Kevin Goodman, child protection investigator

Results

General election

Results

District 66
The district has been represented by Republican Zach Payne since 2020. Payne was first elected with 55.8% of the vote in 2020.

Republican primary

Candidates

Declared
 Zach Payne, incumbent state representative

Results

General election

Results

District 67
The district has been represented by Republican Randy Frye since 2010. Frye was re-elected unopposed in 2020.

Republican primary

Candidates

Declared
 Randy Frye, incumbent state representative

Results

General election

Results

District 68
The district has been represented by Republican Randy Lyness since his appointment in 2015. Lyness was re-elected unopposed in 2020.

Republican primary

Candidates

Declared
 Randy Lyness, incumbent state representative

Results

General election

Results

District 69
The district has been represented by Republican Jim Lucas since 2012. Lucas was re-elected with 67.3% of the vote in 2020.

Republican primary

Candidates

Declared
 Jim Lucas, incumbent state representative

Declined
 Steve Davisson, incumbent state representative for the 73rd district

Results

Democratic primary

Candidates

Declared
 Chad Harmon, subcontract manager

Results

General election

Results

District 70
The district has been represented by Republican Karen Engleman since 2016. Engleman was re-elected with 70.7% of the vote in 2020.

Republican primary

Candidates

Declared
 Karen Engleman, incumbent state representative

Results

Democratic primary

Candidates

Declared
 Jason Shemanski

Results

General election

Results

District 71
The district has been represented by Democrat Rita Fleming since 2018. Fleming was re-elected with 77.6% of the vote in 2020.

Republican primary

Candidates

Declared
 Scott Hawkins, Jeffersonville City Councilman at-large

Results

Democratic primary

Candidates

Declared
 Rita Fleming, incumbent state representative

Results

General election

Results

District 72
The district has been represented by Republican Edward Clere since 2008. Clere was re-elected with 59.4% of the vote in 2020.

Republican primary

Candidates

Declared
 Edward Clere, incumbent state representative
 Jacqueline Grubbs
 Tom Jones

Results

Democratic primary

Candidates

Declared
 Keil Roark

Results

General election

Results

District 73
The district has been represented by Republican Steve Davisson since 2010. Davisson was re-elected unopposed in 2020. Davisson was redistricted to the 68th district and is also running as a candidate for Indiana's 9th congressional district. Davisson died from cancer in September 2021.

Republican primary

Candidates

Declared
 Bob Carmony
 Edward Comstock II, candidate for the 57th district in 2020
 Jennifer Meltzer, Shelbyville attorney

Results

General election

Results

District 74
The district has been represented by Republican Stephen Bartels since his appointment in 2017. Bartels was re-elected unopposed in 2020.

Republican primary

Candidates

Declared
 Stephen Bartels, incumbent state representative

Results

General election

Results

District 75
The district has been represented by Republican Cindy Ledbetter since 2020. Ledbetter was first elected with 61.2% of the vote in 2020.

Republican primary

Candidates

Declared
 Cindy Ledbetter, incumbent state representative

Results

General election

Results

Districts 76–100

District 76
The district has been represented by Republican Wendy McNamara since 2010. McNamara was re-elected with 64% of the vote in 2020.

Republican primary

Candidates

Declared
 Wendy McNamara, incumbent state representative

Results

Democratic primary

Candidates

Declared
 Katherine Rybak

Results

General election

Results

District 77
The district has been represented by Democrat Ryan Hatfield since 2016. Hatfield was re-elected with 61.2% of the vote in 2020.

Democratic primary

Candidates

Declared
 Ryan Hatfield, incumbent state representative

Results

Libertarian convention

Candidates

Declared
Jada Burton, student

General election

Results

District 78
The district has been represented by Republican Tim O'Brien since his appointment in 2021.

Republican primary

Candidates

Declared
 Tim O'Brien, incumbent state representative
 Sean Selby

Results

Democratic primary

Candidates

Declared
 Jason Salstrom

Results

General election

Results

District 79
The district has been represented by Republican Matt Lehman since 2008. Lehman was re-elected unopposed in 2020.

Republican primary

Candidates

Declared
 Matt Lehman, incumbent state representative
 Russ Mounsey, police officer

Results

General election

Results

District 80
The district has been represented by Democrat Phil GiaQuinta since 2006. GiaQuinta was re-elected unopposed in 2020.

Democratic primary

Candidates

Declared
 Phil GiaQuinta, incumbent state representative

Results

General election

Results

District 81
The district has been represented by Republican Martin Carbaugh since 2012. Carbaugh was re-elected with 61.2% of the vote in 2020.

Republican primary

Candidates

Declared
 Martin Carbaugh, incumbent state representative
 David Mervar

Results

General election

Results

District 82
The district has been represented by Republican David Abbott since his appointment in 2018. Abbott was re-elected unopposed in 2020. Abbott was re-districted to District 18.

Republican primary

Candidates

Declared
 Davyd Jones

Declined
 David Abbott, incumbent state representative (running in district 18)

Results

Democratic primary

Candidates

Declared
 Kyle Miller, small business owner and nominee for the 81st district in 2018 and 2020
 Melissa Rinehart, non-profit executive director
 Kathy Zoucha, nominee for the 85th district in 2016 and the 15th State Senate district in 2018

Results

General election

Results

District 83
The district has been represented by Republican Christopher Judy since 2014. Judy was re-elected with 64.7% of the vote in 2020.

Republican primary

Candidates

Declared
 Christopher Judy, incumbent state representative

Results

General election

Results

District 84
The district has been represented by Republican Bob Morris since 2010. Morris was re-elected with 61.1% of the vote in 2020.

Republican primary

Candidates

Declared
 Bob Morris, incumbent state representative

Results

General election

Results

District 85
The district has been represented by Republican Dave Heine since 2016. Heine was re-elected with 71.8% of the vote in 2020.

Republican primary

Candidates

Declared
 Dave Heine, incumbent state representative
 Stan Jones
 Chris Pence

Results

General election

Results

District 86
The district has been represented by Democrat Ed DeLaney since 2008. DeLaney was re-elected with 70% of the vote in 2020.

Republican primary

Candidates

Declared
 Mark Small, lawyer and candidate for Indiana's 5th congressional district in 2020

Results

Democratic primary

Candidates

Declared
 Ed DeLaney, incumbent state representative

Results

General election

Results

District 87
The district has been represented by Democrat Carey Hamilton since 2016. Hamilton was re-elected with 62.7% of the vote in 2020.

Republican primary

Candidates

Declared
 Jordan Davis

Results

Democratic primary

Candidates

Declared
 Carey Hamilton, incumbent state representative

Results

General election

Results

District 88
The district has been represented by Republican Chris Jeter since 2020. Jeter was re-elected with 59.3% of the vote in 2020.

Republican primary

Candidates

Declared
 Chris Jeter, incumbent state representative
 Chrystal Sisson

Results

Democratic primary

Candidates

Declared
 Donna Griffin
 Craig Hirsty

Results

General election

Results

District 89
The district has been represented by Democrat Mitch Gore since 2020. Ledbetter was first elected with 51.3% of the vote in 2020.

Republican primary

Candidates

Declared
 Michael-Paul Hart, Indianapolis City-County Council member for the 18th district

Results

Democratic primary

Candidates

Declared
 Mitch Gore, incumbent state representative

Results

General election

Results

District 90
The district has been represented by Republican Mike Speedy since 2010. Speedy was re-elected with 63.9% of the vote in 2020.

Republican primary

Candidates

Declared
 Mike Speedy, incumbent state representative
 David Waters

Results

Socialism and Liberation

Candidates

Declared
 Noah Leininger

General election

Results

District 91
The district has been represented by Republican Robert Behning since 1992. Behning was re-elected with 59.5% of the vote in 2020.

Republican primary

Candidates

Declared
 Robert Behning, incumbent state representative
 David Hewitt

Results

General election

Results

District 92
The district has been represented by Democrat Renee Pack since 2020. Pack was first elected unopposed in 2020.

Republican primary

Candidates

Declared
 John Couch, candidate for this district in 2014 and for Indiana's 7th congressional district in 2018

Results

Democratic primary

Candidates

Declared
 Renee Pack, incumbent state representative

Results

General election

Results

District 93
The district has been represented by Republican John Jacob since 2020. Jacob was first elected with 61% of the vote in 2020.

Republican primary

Candidates

Declared
 John Jacob, incumbent state representative
 Julie McGuire

Results

Democratic primary

Candidates

Declared
 Andy Miller, electrician and candidate for this district in 2020

Results

General election

Results

District 94
The district has been represented by Democrat Cherrish Pryor since 2008. Pryor was re-elected with 85.5% of the vote in 2020.

Democratic primary

Candidates

Declared
 Cherrish Pryor, incumbent state representative

Results

General election

Results

District 95
The district has been represented by Democrat John Bartlett since 2008. Bartlett was re-elected unopposed in 2020.

Democratic primary

Candidates

Declared
 John Bartlett, incumbent state representative

Results

General election

Results

District 96
The district has been represented by Democrat Greg Porter since 1992. Porter was first re-elected unopposed in 2020.

Democratic primary

Candidates

Declared
 Greg Porter, incumbent state representative

Results

General election

Results

District 97
The district has been represented by Democrat Justin Moed since 2012. Moed was re-elected with 55.5% of the vote in 2020.

Republican primary

Candidates

Declared
 John Schmitz, construction company owner, candidate for Mayor of Indianapolis in 2019 and for this district in 2020

Results

Democratic primary

Candidates

Declared
 Justin Moed, incumbent state representative

Libertarian convention

Candidates

Declared
Edgar Villegas

Results

General election

Results

District 98
The district has been represented by Democrat Robin Shackleford since 2012. Shackleford was re-elected unopposed in 2020.

Democratic primary

Candidates

Declared
 Robin Shackleford, incumbent state representative

Results

General election

Results

District 99
The district has been represented by Democrat Vanessa Summers since her appointment in 1991. Summers was re-elected unopposed in 2020.

Republican primary

Candidates

Declared
 Felipe Rios, minister, candidate for Mayor of Indianapolis in 2019 and for the 97th district in 2020

Results

Democratic primary

Candidates

Declared
 Vanessa Summers, incumbent state representative

Results

General election

Results

District 100
The district has been represented by Democrat Blake Johnson since his appointment 2020. Johnson was re-elected with 67% of the vote in 2020.

Democratic primary

Candidates

Declared
 Blake Johnson, incumbent state representative

Results

General election

Results

References

Indiana House of Representatives
Indiana House
Indiana House of Representatives elections